The 1983 World Badminton Grand Prix was the first edition of the World Badminton Grand Prix finals. It was held in Istora Senayan, Jakarta, Indonesia, from December 14 to December 18, 1983.

Results

Third place

Finals

References
https://web.archive.org/web/20061214221836/http://tangkis.tripod.com/prix/final/prix83.htm
https://eresources.nlb.gov.sg/newspapers/Digitised/Article/straitstimes19831217-1.2.12.4
https://eresources.nlb.gov.sg/newspapers/Digitised/Article/straitstimes19831218-1.2.121.4
https://eresources.nlb.gov.sg/newspapers/Digitised/Article/straitstimes19831219-1.1.31.aspx
https://eresources.nlb.gov.sg/newspapers/Digitised/Article/straitstimes19831218-1.1.35.aspx
https://badmintonmuseet.dk/wp-content/uploads/2019/07/1983_10.pdf

B
World Grand Prix
World Badminton Grand Prix
Badminton tournaments in Indonesia